Jacob Andrew Nottingham (born April 3, 1995) is an American professional baseball catcher and first baseman in the Seattle Mariners organization. He has previously played in Major League Baseball (MLB) for the Milwaukee Brewers and Seattle Mariners.

Career

Amateur career
Nottingham attended Redlands High School in Redlands, California. He accepted an offer to play college baseball at the University of Oklahoma.

Houston Astros
The Houston Astros selected him in the sixth round of the 2013 Major League Baseball Draft. He made his professional debut that year with the Gulf Coast Astros, where he spent the whole season, batting .247 with one home run and 20 RBIs in 44 games. In 2014, he played for the Greeneville Astros, where he batted .230 with five home runs and 28 RBIs, and he started 2015 with the Quad Cities River Bandits. He was promoted to the Lancaster JetHawks in late June.

Oakland Athletics
Prior to the 2015 trade deadline, the Astros traded Nottingham and Daniel Mengden to the Oakland Athletics for Scott Kazmir. Oakland assigned him to the Stockton Ports, where he finished the season. In 119 total games between Quad City, Lancaster, and Stockton, Nottingham posted a .316 batting average with 17 home runs, 82 RBIs, and an .877 OPS.

Milwaukee Brewers
On February 12, 2016, the Athletics traded Nottingham and Bubba Derby to the Milwaukee Brewers for Khris Davis. Nottingham spent 2016 with the Biloxi Shuckers where he hit .234 with 11 home runs and 37 RBIs. After the season, the Brewers assigned Nottingham to the Salt River Rafters of the Arizona Fall League. Nottingham returned to Biloxi in 2017 where he struggled, batting only .209 with nine home runs and 48 RBIs in 101 games. The Brewers added him to their 40-man roster after the 2017 season.

Nottingham began the 2018 season with the Colorado Springs Sky Sox of the Class AAA Pacific Coast League. The Brewers promoted him to the major leagues on April 16, 2018. Nottingham finished the year with 4 hits in 20 at-bats. He began the 2019 season in AAA with the San Antonio Missions, but was recalled from AAA on May 16, 2019. On May 17, in a game against the Atlanta Braves, he hit his first career home run. On the year, Nottingham only registered 6 at-bats, getting 2 hits including his first MLB home run off of Josh Tomlin of the Atlanta Braves. Nottingham appeared in a career-high 20 games in 2020, hitting .188/.278/.458 with career highs in home runs (4) and RBI (13) in 48 at-bats.

In the 2020–21 offseason, Nottingham underwent surgery on the radial collateral ligament on his left thumb. After spending the beginning of the 2021 season recovering from the surgery, he was designated for assignment by Milwaukee on April 22. On April 28, he was claimed off waivers by the Seattle Mariners. On May 1, the Mariners designated him for assignment. The next day, the Mariners traded him to the Brewers in exchange for cash considerations. The Brewers, who were dealing with injuries to starter Omar Narváez and backup Manny Piña, immediately added Nottingham to the active roster. In his first at-bat back with Milwaukee, he hit a solo home run off of Los Angeles Dodgers starter Julio Urías. In the 8th inning of the same game, he hit a two-run homer off of Mike Kickham, giving him his first career multi-homer game in his return to Milwaukee. On May 13, he was again designated for assignment by Milwaukee.

Seattle Mariners
On May 20, 2021, he was again claimed off waivers by the Seattle Mariners. Nottingham being claimed off waivers twice by the Mariners within a span of a month exposed a loophole which was closed by the Collective Bargaining Agreement (CBA) that resolved the 2021–22 MLB lockout. The new clause, in which a player can’t be claimed off waivers for a second time by the same ballclub within a season until each of the other teams have passed on him, is colloquially known as the Jacob Nottingham Rule. He was again designated for assignment by Seattle on June 8, after going 3-for-26 with 1 home run. He was outrighted to the Triple-A Tacoma Rainiers on June 12. He was released by the Mariners organization on September 21.

Baltimore Orioles
Nottingham signed a minor league contract with the Baltimore Orioles on December 8, 2021. He was assigned to the Triple-A Norfolk Tides to begin the season, where he spent all of 2022. In 89 games, Nottingham hit .229/.333/.425 with 15 home runs, 51 RBI, and 12 stolen bases. He elected free agency on November 10, 2022.

Seattle Mariners (second stint)
On January 3, 2023, Nottingham signed a minor league deal with the Seattle Mariners.

Personal life
Nottingham's grandmother and aunt both died of amyotrophic lateral sclerosis. He has a tattoo of them being watched over by Lou Gehrig on his left arm.

References

External links

Living people
1995 births
People from Redlands, California
Baseball players from California
Major League Baseball catchers
Milwaukee Brewers players
Seattle Mariners players
Gulf Coast Astros players
Greeneville Astros players
Quad Cities River Bandits players
Lancaster JetHawks players
Stockton Ports players
Biloxi Shuckers players
Salt River Rafters players
Colorado Springs Sky Sox players
San Antonio Missions players
Tacoma Rainiers players
Norfolk Tides players
American expatriate baseball players in the Dominican Republic
Tigres del Licey players